Walter Nehb (3 December 1908 – 6 March 1966) was a German sprinter. He competed in the men's 400 metres at the 1932 Summer Olympics.

References

1908 births
1966 deaths
Athletes (track and field) at the 1932 Summer Olympics
German male sprinters
Olympic athletes of Germany
Place of birth missing